WLAG (1240 AM, "Eagle Sports 1240 & 96.9") is a radio station broadcasting a sports format featuring programming from ESPN Radio. WLAG is licensed to serve the community of La Grange, Georgia, United States.  The station is currently owned by Eagle's Nest, Inc.

History
WLAG's first license was granted on May 5, 1941.  From 1941 to 1987, the station was owned and managed by Edwin Mullinax.

(The WLAG call sign had been used by other broadcasters.  From 1922 to 1924, it was used for the precursor to WCCO in Minneapolis, Minnesota, one of the Upper Midwest's most notable broadcasters.)

Previous logo

References

External links
WLAG official website

LAG
CBS Sports Radio stations
Companies based in Troup County, Georgia
Radio stations established in 1941